Telorchiidae is a family of trematode parasites.

Classification 
Ten genera are described, classified in five subfamilies:
 Allotelorchiinae Goodman, 1988
 Allotelorchis Goodman, 1988
 Auritelorchis Stunkard, 1979
 Loefgreniinae Yamaguti, 1958
 Loefgrenia Travassos, 1920
 Opisthioglyphinae Dollfus, 1949
 Dolichosaccus Johnson, 1912
 Opisthioglyphe Looss, 1899
 Orchidasmatinae Dollfus, 1937
 Orchidasma Looss, 1900
 Telorchiinae Looss, 1899
 Divitelluses Cai & Li, 1993
 Oligolecithus Vercammen-Grandjean, 1960
 Protenes Barker & Covey, 1911
 Pseudotelorchis Yamaguti, 1971
 Telorchis Lühe, 1899

In 2017, the World Register of Marine Species recognizes two genera: Orchidasma and Telorchis.

References 

Plagiorchiida
Trematode families